Willows is an unincorporated community in Lake of the Rivers Rural Municipality No. 72, Saskatchewan, Canada. It previously held the status of a village until January 1, 1950. The name is a contraction of William Gibson Lowes, owner of the first store.

Demographics 
Prior to January 1, 1950, Willows was incorporated as a village, and was restructured as an unincorporated community under the jurisdiction of the Rural municipality of Lake of The Rivers on that date.

See also 
 List of communities in Saskatchewan
 List of geographic acronyms and initialisms

References 

Former villages in Saskatchewan
Lake of the Rivers No. 72, Saskatchewan
Unincorporated communities in Saskatchewan
Division No. 3, Saskatchewan